The 33rd annual Cairo International Film Festival was held from November 10 to November 20, 2009. Indian director Adoor Gopalakrishnan was the President of the Jury.

Films in competition
The following films competed for the Golden Pyramid.

Digital Competition
The following films were screened in the Digital Competition for Feature Films category.

Arab Competition
The following films were screened in the Arab Competition for Feature Films category.

Films out of competition
The following films were screened out of the competition.

Juries

International Competition
 Adoor Gopalakrishnan, Indian director (President)
 Belkacem Hadjadj, Algerian director
 Marcelo Mosenson, Argentinian producer
 Anaïs Barbeau-Lavalette, Canadian actress and director
 Hala Fakher, Egyptian actress
 Moustafa Fahmi, Egyptian actor and cinematographer
 Giuseppe Piccioni, Italian director, writer, actor and producer
 Ingeborga Dapkunaite, Lithuanian actress
 Krzysztof Krauze, Polish director and screenwriter
 Ioana Maria Uricaru, Romanian director
 Juan Diego Botto, Spanish actor
 Tom Berenger, American actor

Digital Competition
 Victor Okhai, Nigerian director, writer and producer (President)
 Nadia Kaci, Algerian actress
 Marianne Khoury, Egyptian director and producer
 Imma Piro, Italian actress
 Vikas Swarup, Indian writer
 Joanna Kos-Krauze, Polish director and screenwriter
 Rachid Ferchiou, Tunisian director and screenwriter
 Norma Heyman, English actress
 Edreace Purmul, American director

Arab Competition
 Yehia El-Fakharany, Egyptian actor (President)
 Lyès Salem, Algerian director
 Ghada Adel, Egyptian actress
 Kassem Hawal, Iraqi director
 Sana Mouziane, Moroccan actress
 Mai Masri, Palestinian director

Awards
The winners of the 2009 Cairo International Film Festival were:

 Golden Pyramid: Postia Pappi Jaakobille by Klaus Härö
 Sliver Pyramid: Le hérisson by Mona Achache
 Best Director: Mona Achache for Le hérisson
 Saad El-Din Wahba Prize (Best Screenplay): Klaus Härö for Postia Pappi Jaakobille
 Best Actor: 
 Fathy Abdel Wahab for The Nile Birds
 Subrat Dutta for Madholal Keep Walking
 Best Actress: Karolina Piechota for Drzazgi
 Naguib Mahfouz Prize (Best Directorial Debut): Gonzalo Calzada for Luisa
 Youssef Chahine Prize (Best Artistic Contribution): Vera Glagoleva for Odna voyna
 Best Arabic Film: Amreeka by Cherien Dabis
 Best Arabic Screenplay: Cherien Dabis for Amreeka
 Arabic Film Special Mention:
 Heliopolis by Ahmad Abdalla
 The Long Night by Hatem Ali
 Golden Award for Digital Films: The Rapture of Fe by Alvin Yapan
 Silver Award for Digital Films:
 Exile in Paris by Ahmet Zirek
 First Time by Krishnan Seshardi Gomatam
 FIPRESCI Prize: Mona Achache for Le hérisson

External links
Official Cairo International Festival Site (in English) 
 Cairo International Film Festival:2009 at Internet Movie Database

Cairo International Film Festival
Cairo International Film Festival, 2009
Cairo International Film Festival, 2009
2000s in Cairo